is the debut studio album of Japanese singer-songwriter Miho Komatsu. It was released on 3 December 1997 in Amemura-O-Town Record.

Background
The album includes two previously released singles, Nazo and Kagayakeru Hoshi. Several of her songs were originally written for other bands: "Sabitsuita Machine Gun De Ima Wo Uchinukou" for Wands, "Aoi Sora Ni Deaeta" for Arisa Tsujio as the Chūka Ichiban! anime theme song, "Kono Machi De Kimi to Kurishitai" for Field of View, and "Kimi ga Inai Natsu" for Deen.

Charting performance
The album reached number 5 in its first week, with 89,810 copies sold. The album charted for 40 weeks and it sold 400,000 copies altogether.

Track listing
All songs were arranged by Masao Akashi (#1,#2,#7~#10) and Hirohito Furui (Garnet Crow) (#3~#6,#11)

Usage in media
Nazo was used as 3rd opening theme for Anime television series Detective Conan
Kagayakeru Hoshi was used as ending theme for anime television series Ninpen Manmaru
Dream'n Love was used as theme song for MBS radio's program Sport Dom
Alive was used as image song for "Astel Kansai Corporation" CF

References 

1997 debut albums
Amemura-O-Town Record albums
Songs written by Miho Komatsu
Being Inc. albums
Albums produced by Daiko Nagato